Lucille Mason Rose (September 27, 1920 - 1987) was an African-American civil servant and political activist who served as a New York City Deputy Mayor. She also served as the first woman president of the Catholic Interracial Council.

Biography

Early life 
Born in Richmond, Virginia, Lucille Rose moved with her family to Brooklyn, New York at the age of seven. Her parents owned and operated a restaurant called Mason Dining Room around this time, which Rose's mother later took over and ran independently after Rose's father's death. Lucille Rose graduated from Girls High School in 1937.

Career 
Lucille Rose began her public service career in 1949 as a fiscal clerk in the Department of Social Services. In 1963, she earned a degree in economics from Brooklyn College. After earning her degree, she served as director of the Bedford-Stuyvesant office of the city's Department of Labor. Rose was named deputy commissioner of the city Manpower and Career Development Agency by Mayor John V. Lindsay in 1970. In 1972, she was appointed Commissioner of Department of Employment. Beyond her official obligations, Rose held other posts in civic and political organizations, namely the National Association for the Advancement of Colored People, the National Democratic Committee, the Salvation Army Advisory Committee, and St. Mary's Hospital. She was also the first woman president of the Catholic Interracial Council.

References

1920 births
1987 deaths
Deputy mayors of New York City
Women in New York (state) politics
Women in New York City
Politicians from Richmond, Virginia
Brooklyn College alumni
20th-century American politicians
20th-century American women politicians
New York (state) Democrats
Politicians from Brooklyn
African-American Catholics